A cable-stayed bridge has one or more towers (or pylons), from which cables support the bridge deck. A distinctive feature are the cables or stays, which run directly from the tower to the deck, normally forming a fan-like pattern or a series of parallel lines. This is in contrast to the modern suspension bridge, where the cables supporting the deck are suspended vertically from the main cable, anchored at both ends of the bridge and running between the towers. The cable-stayed bridge is optimal for spans longer than cantilever bridges and shorter than suspension bridges. This is the range within which cantilever bridges would rapidly grow heavier, and suspension bridge cabling would be more costly.

Cable-stayed bridges were being designed and constructed by the late 16th century, and the form found wide use in the late 19th century. Early examples, including the Brooklyn Bridge, often combined features from both the cable-stayed and suspension designs. Cable-stayed designs fell from favor in the early 20th century as larger gaps were bridged using pure suspension designs, and shorter ones using various systems built of reinforced concrete. It returned to prominence in the later 20th century when the combination of new materials, larger construction machinery, and the need to replace older bridges all lowered the relative price of these designs.

History

Cable-stayed bridges date back to 1595, where designs were found in Machinae Novae, a book by Croatian-Venetian inventor Fausto Veranzio. Many early suspension bridges were cable-stayed construction, including the 1817 footbridge Dryburgh Abbey Bridge, James Dredge's patented Victoria Bridge, Bath (1836), and the later Albert Bridge (1872) and Brooklyn Bridge (1883). Their designers found that the combination of technologies created a stiffer bridge. John A. Roebling took particular advantage of this to limit deformations due to railway loads in the Niagara Falls Suspension Bridge.

The earliest known surviving example of a true cable-stayed bridge in the United States is E.E. Runyon's largely intact steel or iron Bluff Dale Suspension bridge with wooden stringers and decking in Bluff Dale, Texas (1890), or his weeks earlier but ruined Barton Creek Bridge between Huckabay, Texas and Gordon, Texas (1889 or 1890).  In the twentieth century, early examples of cable-stayed bridges included A. Gisclard's unusual Cassagnes bridge (1899), in which the horizontal part of the cable forces is balanced by a separate horizontal tie cable, preventing significant compression in the deck, and G. Leinekugel le Coq's bridge at Lézardrieux in Brittany (1924). Eduardo Torroja designed a cable-stayed aqueduct at Tempul in 1926. Albert Caquot's 1952 concrete-decked cable-stayed bridge over the Donzère-Mondragon canal at Pierrelatte is one of the first of the modern type, but had little influence on later development. The steel-decked Strömsund Bridge designed by Franz Dischinger (1955) is, therefore, more often cited as the first modern cable-stayed bridge.

Other key pioneers included Fabrizio de Miranda, Riccardo Morandi, and Fritz Leonhardt. Early bridges from this period used very few stay cables, as in the Theodor Heuss Bridge (1958). However, this involves substantial erection costs, and more modern structures tend to use many more cables to ensure greater economy.

Comparison with suspension bridge

Cable-stayed bridges may appear to be similar to suspension bridges, but they are quite different in principle and construction. In suspension bridges, large main cables (normally two) hang between the towers and are anchored at each end to the ground. This can be difficult to implement when ground conditions are poor. The main cables, which are free to move on bearings in the towers, bear the load of the bridge deck. Before the deck is installed, the cables are under tension from their own weight. Along the main cables smaller cables or rods connect to the bridge deck, which is lifted in sections. As this is done, the tension in the cables increases, as it does with the live load of traffic crossing the bridge. The tension on the main cables is transferred to the ground at the anchorages and by downwards compression on the towers.

In cable-stayed bridges, the towers are the primary load-bearing structures that transmit the bridge loads to the ground. A cantilever approach is often used to support the bridge deck near the towers, but lengths further from them are supported by cables running directly to the towers. That has the disadvantage, unlike for the suspension bridge, that the cables pull to the sides as opposed to directly up, which requires the bridge deck to be stronger to resist the resulting horizontal compression loads, but it has the advantage of not requiring firm anchorages to resist the horizontal pull of the main cables of the suspension bridge. By design, all static horizontal forces of the cable-stayed bridge are balanced so that the supporting towers do not tend to tilt or slide and so must only resist horizontal forces from the live loads.

The following are key advantages of the cable-stayed form:
 much greater stiffness than the suspension bridge, so that deformations of the deck under live loads are reduced
 can be constructed by cantilevering out from the tower – the cables act both as temporary and permanent supports to the bridge deck
 for a symmetrical bridge (in which the spans on either side of the tower are the same), the horizontal forces balance and large ground anchorages are not required

Designs
There are four major classes of rigging on cable-stayed bridges: mono, harp, fan, and star.

 The mono design uses a single cable from its towers and is one of the lesser-used examples of the class.
 In the harp or parallel design, the cables are nearly parallel so that the height of their attachment to the tower is proportional to the distance from the tower to their mounting on the deck.
 In the fan design, the cables all connect to or pass over the top of the towers. The fan design is structurally superior with a minimum moment applied to the towers, but, for practical reasons, the modified fan (also called the semi-fan) is preferred, especially where many cables are necessary. In the modified fan arrangement, the cables terminate near the top of the tower but are spaced from each other sufficiently to allow better termination, improved environmental protection, and good access to individual cables for maintenance.
 In the star design, another relatively rare design, the cables are spaced apart on the tower, like the harp design, but connect to one point or a number of closely spaced points on the deck.

There are also seven main arrangements for support columns: single, double, portal, A-shaped, H-shaped, inverted Y and M-shaped. The last three are hybrid arrangements that combine two arrangements into one.

 The single arrangement uses a single column for cable support, normally projecting through the center of the deck, but in some cases located on one side or the other. Examples: Millau Viaduct in France and Sunshine Skyway Bridge in Florida.
 The double arrangement places pairs of columns on both sides of the deck. Examples: Øresund Bridge between Denmark and Sweden, and Zolotoy Bridge in Russia.
 The portal is similar to the double arrangement but has a third member connecting the tops of the two columns to form a door-like shape or portal. This offers additional strength, especially against traverse loads. Examples: Hale Boggs Bridge in Louisiana and Kirumi Bridge in Tanzania.
 The A-shaped design is similar in concept to the portal but achieves the same goal by angling the two columns towards each other to meet at the top, eliminating the need for the third member. Examples: Arthur Ravenel Jr. Bridge in South Carolina and Helgeland Bridge in Norway.
 The H-shaped design combines the portal on the bottom with the double on top. Examples: Grenland Bridge in Norway and Vasco da Gama Bridge in Portugal.
 The inverted Y design combines the A-shaped on the bottom with the single on top. Examples: Pont de Normandie in France and Incheon Bridge in South Korea.
 The M-shaped design combines two A-shaped, each tower on the side of the other, to form an M. This type of arrangement is rare, and is mostly used in wide bridges where a lonely A-shaped arrangement would be too weak. Examples: Fred Hartman Bridge in Texas and its planned sister bridge Ship Channel Bridge, also in Texas.

Depending on the design, the columns may be vertical or angled or curved relative to the bridge deck.

Variations

Side-spar cable-stayed bridge

A side-spar cable-stayed bridge uses a central tower supported only on one side. This design allows the construction of a curved bridge.

Cantilever spar cable-stayed bridge
Far more radical in its structure, the Puente del Alamillo (1992) uses a single cantilever spar on one side of the span, with cables on one side only to support the bridge deck. Unlike other cable-stayed types, this bridge exerts considerable overturning force upon its foundation and the spar must resist the bending caused by the cables, as the cable forces are not balanced by opposing cables. The spar of this particular bridge forms the gnomon of a large garden sundial. Related bridges by the architect Santiago Calatrava include the Puente de la Mujer (2001), Sundial Bridge (2004), Chords Bridge (2008), and Assut de l'Or Bridge (2008).

Multiple-span cable-stayed bridge

Cable-stayed bridges with more than three spans involve significantly more challenging designs than do 2-span or 3-span structures.

In a 2-span or 3-span cable-stayed bridge, the loads from the main spans are normally anchored back near the end abutments by stays in the end spans. For more spans, this is not the case and the bridge structure is less stiff overall. This can create difficulties in both the design of the deck and the pylons.
Examples of multiple-span structures in which this is the case include Ting Kau Bridge, where additional 'cross-bracing' stays are used to stabilise the pylons; Millau Viaduct and Mezcala Bridge, where twin-legged towers are used; and General Rafael Urdaneta Bridge, where very stiff multi-legged frame towers were adopted. A similar situation with a suspension bridge is found at both the Great Seto Bridge and San Francisco–Oakland Bay Bridge where additional anchorage piers are required after every set of three suspension spans – this solution can also be adapted for cable-stayed bridges.

Extradosed bridge

An extradosed bridge is a cable-stayed bridge with a more substantial bridge deck that, being stiffer and stronger, allows the cables to be omitted close to the tower and for the towers to be lower in proportion to the span. The first extradosed bridges were the Ganter Bridge and Sunniberg Bridge in Switzerland. The first extradosed bridge in the United States, the Pearl Harbor Memorial Bridge was built to carry I-95 across the Quinnipiac River in New Haven, Connecticut, opening in June 2012.

Cable-stayed cradle-system bridge

A cradle system carries the strands within the stays from the bridge deck to bridge deck, as a continuous element, eliminating anchorages in the pylons. Each epoxy-coated steel strand is carried inside the cradle in a one-inch (2.54 cm) steel tube. Each strand acts independently, allowing for removal, inspection, and replacement of individual strands. The first two such bridges are the Penobscot Narrows Bridge, completed in 2006, and the Veterans' Glass City Skyway, completed in 2007.

Related bridge types

Self-anchored suspension bridge

A self-anchored suspension bridge has some similarity in principle to the cable-stayed type in that tension forces that prevent the deck from dropping are converted into compression forces vertically in the tower and horizontally along the deck structure. It is also related to the suspension bridge in having arcuate main cables with suspender cables, although the self-anchored type lacks the heavy cable anchorages of the ordinary suspension bridge. Unlike either a cable-stayed bridge or a suspension bridge, the self-anchored suspension bridge must be supported by falsework during construction and so it is more expensive to construct.

Notable cable-stayed bridges

Journalist Phelippe Daou Bridge crosses the Rio Negro in Amazonas state.
Arthur Ravenel Jr. Bridge, crosses the Cooper River in Charleston, South Carolina. It opened in 2005 to replace the John P. Grace Memorial Bridge and the Silas N. Pearman Bridge which were nearing the end of their useful lives. At the time of its opening it was the longest cable-stayed bridge span in the Western Hemisphere.
Brooklyn Bridge, famous as a suspension bridge, also has cable stays.

Erasmus Bridge crosses the Nieuwe Maas in Rotterdam, Netherlands. The southern span of the bridge has an  bascule bridge for ships that cannot pass under the bridge. The bascule bridge is the largest and heaviest in West Europe and has the largest panel of its type in the world.

Golden Horn Metro Bridge, connects the old peninsula of Istanbul with the Galata district and is the first cable-stayed bridge in Turkey.
The Gordie Howe International Bridge currently under construction, connecting Detroit, Michigan with Windsor, Ontario, will have two "A" shaped towers built on the banks of the Detroit River, six-lanes for automotive traffic, and a cycle and walking path.
 Jiaxing-Shaoxing Sea Bridge, Zhejiang Province, China. It was opened on 23 July 2013 and is currently the longest cable-stayed bridge in the world.
John James Audubon Bridge (Mississippi River): The longest cable-stayed bridge in the Western Hemisphere, crossing the Mississippi River between New Roads, Louisiana and St. Francisville, Louisiana.
 Kap Shui Mun Bridge: Road-rail cable-stayed bridge with longest span when opened
Kosciuszko Bridge: This connects the boroughs of Brooklyn and Queens in New York City, replacing a truss bridge of the same name. The first cable-stayed span (temporarily carrying three lanes in each direction) opened to traffic in April 2017. A second, nearly identical span opened on 29 August 2019.

Margaret Hunt Hill Bridge in Dallas, Texas, U.S.A., which opened in 2012 and spans the Trinity River. In 2012, the bridge received an Outstanding Civil Engineering Achievement Award from the Texas section of the American Society of Civil Engineers. The bridge also received a 2012 European Convention for Constructional Steelwork Award For Steel Bridges.

Most SNP (Nový most), the world's longest cable-stayed bridge in category with one pylon and with one cable-stayed plane, spanning the Danube in Bratislava, Slovakia. The only member of World Federation of Great Towers that is primarily used as a bridge.
Octavio Frias de Oliveira bridge crosses the Pinheiros River in São Paulo, 2008. It has a -high pylon under which two stayed roads cross each other turning 90° to the opposite bank of the river.

Pelješac Bridge, Dubrovnik-Neretva County, Croatia.
Ponte Morandi, part of which collapsed during a rainstorm on 14 August 2018
Pont de Normandie, crosses the Seine in Normandy, France (1988 - 1995) – briefly the world's longest cable-stayed bridge.
Queensferry Crossing (formerly the Forth Replacement Crossing) is a road bridge in Scotland. It is built alongside the existing, suspension, Forth Road Bridge across the Firth of Forth and upon completion in 2017 became the longest triple-tower cable-stayed bridge in the world at 2700m.
Pont de Brotonne, first modern cable-stayed bridge of that type, opened to traffic in 1977.
Rande Bridge in Spain near Vigo is the highway cable-stayed bridge with the longest and slenderest span in the world at the time of construction (1973–1977). Three long spans of  +  + . Pylons in concrete, girder in steel.
Rio-Antirio bridge crosses the Gulf of Corinth near Patras, Greece. However, as the latter is also supported by bearings at the pylons apart from cable stays, the Rio–Antirrio bridge deck might be considered the longest cable-stayed fully suspended deck in the world.
Russky Bridge, the cable-stayed bridge with the world's longest span, at  meters. Vladivostok, Russia.

Sunshine Skyway Bridge, in the US State of Florida located near Tampa opened in 1989. The bridge replaced the original cantilever bridges which were the site of a maritime incident. 
Surgut Bridge, the longest single-pylon cable-stayed bridge in the world, crossing the Ob River in Siberia, Russia.
Completed in 2008, the Sutong Bridge is one of over 40 cable-stayed bridges built over the Yangtze since 1995.
Tilikum Crossing in Portland, Oregon, is the first major bridge in the U.S. that was designed to allow access to transit vehicles, cyclists and pedestrians but not cars.
Ting Kau Bridge, the world's first major four-span (three towers) cable-stayed bridge, forming part of the road network connecting Hong Kong International Airport to other parts of Hong Kong.
Varina-Enon Bridge, Carries I-295 across the James River between Henrico and Chesterfield Counties in Virginia. Varina-Enon Bridge features the world's first use of precast concrete delta frames for construction of its  cable-stayed main span. It is an instrumental part of the Peregrine Falcon program overseen by the Virginia Department of Transportation.
It is also the first cable-stayed bridge with an asymmetrical deck design, with two of the 10 lanes cantilevered from the south side of the main bridge deck. 
The Kazungula Bridge is a road and rail bridge over the Zambezi river between the countries of Zambia and Botswana (3,028 feet). 
Zárate–Brazo Largo Bridges over the Paraná Guazú and Paraná de las Palmas Rivers in Argentina (1972–1976) are the first two road and railway long-span cable-stayed steel bridges in the world. Spans:  +  + .

See also
Floating cable-stayed bridge
Cable-stayed suspension bridge

References

Further reading
 De Miranda F., et al., (1979), "Basic problems in long span cable stayed bridges", Rep. n. 25, Dipartimento di Strutture – Università di Calabria – Arcavacata (CS) Italy, (242 pagg.) September 1979.

*

External links

North American Cable Stayed Bridge Registry
Structurae: Cable-stayed Bridges
Cable-Stayed Bridge

 
Bridges by structural type
Croatian inventions